Jejomar "Jojo" Cabauatan Binay Sr. (born Jesus Jose Cabauatan Binay; November 11, 1942) is a Filipino lawyer and politician who served as the 13th vice president of the Philippines from 2010 to 2016, under President Benigno Aquino III.

A human rights lawyer during the Martial law period under President Ferdinand Marcos, Binay provided free legal services to political prisoners before being arrested and detained at the Ipil Rehabilitation Center. He also helped found the Movement for Brotherhood, Integrity and Nationalism, Inc. (MABINI) along with other human rights lawyers.

Binay was appointed by President Corazon Aquino as officer-in-charge of Makati as mayor from 1986 to 1987. After his tenure, he was elected as mayor of Makati in 1988 and served until 2010, serving 6 consecutive terms as mayor. Concurrently, he was also the chairman of the Metropolitan Manila Development Authority (MMDA) from 1990 to 1991. On October 21, 2009 it was announced that Binay would seek the vice-presidency as the running mate of presidential candidate Joseph Estrada. Though the latter lost to Benigno Aquino III, Binay won the vice presidency, garnering 41.65% of the vote cast, with runner up Mar Roxas receiving 39.58%. During his time as vice president of the Philippines, he was appointed as chairman of the Housing and Urban Development Coordinating Council and as presidential adviser on overseas Filipino workers but resigned on June 22, 2015, due to differences with President Benigno Aquino and some of his cabinet members. Binay ran and failed to secure a senate position in the 2022 general elections, garnering over 13 million votes and placing thirteenth on the vote list. In 2018, Binay was identified by the Human Rights Victims' Claims Board as a Motu Proprio human rights violations victim of the Martial Law Era.

Early life
Jejomar Binay was born in Paco, Manila. The name "Jejomar" is a portmanteau of Jesus, Joseph, and Mary. He is the younger of two children of Diego "Jego" Medrano Binay, a librarian from Bauan, Batangas, and Lourdes Gatan Cabauatan, a school teacher from Cabagan, Isabela. He had an older sibling who died before he was born, making him the only one who survived childhood. After being orphaned at the age of nine, he was adopted by his uncle, Ponciano Binay.

Education
Binay finished basic education at the Philippine Normal College Training Department and graduated from the University of the Philippines Preparatory School.

He went to the University of the Philippines Diliman for college and graduated in 1962 with a degree in political science. While studying at UP, he became member of the Alpha Phi Omega fraternity. He continued on to the UP College of Law and graduated in 1967 then passed the bar examinations in 1968. He got a master's degree from the University of Santo Tomas in 1980 and a master's degree in National Security Administration from the National Defense College of the Philippines. He took up Strategic Economic Program in the Center for Research and Communication. He enrolled in a Non-Resident and General Staff Course at the Command and General Staff College, AFP and joined the seniors executive fellow program at the John F. Kennedy School of Government in Harvard University. 

In 1993, he received a diploma in Land Use Program from the University of the Philippines. In 1996, he finished the Top Management Program at the Asian Institute of Management in Bali, Indonesia. He also took up the Joint Services and Command Staff course in the AFP. He also has a master's degree in management at the Philippine Christian University and a diploma in Environmental and Natural Resources Management from the University of the Philippines Open University.

Legal career
Upon passing the bar examination to be a lawyer, Binay took up human rights law. During the period of martial law under President Ferdinand Marcos, he represented political prisoners in the 1970s for no charge. After some time, he himself was detained.

Binay entered into legal aid by starting the Lupon ng mga Manananggol ng Bayan (LUMABAN) in 1970 during the First Quarter Storm. He was imprisoned in 1973, and after he was released, Binay entered the Free Legal Assistance Group (FLAG) led by Sen. Jose. W. Diokno, and became chairman of its Metro Manila Chapter. In 1980, Binay, Augusto "Bobbit" Sanchez, Rene Saguisag, Fulgencio Factoran, Lorenzo Tañada, Joker Arroyo, and other human rights lawyers created the Movement of Attorneys for Brotherhood, Integrity, and Nationalism (MABINI).

Political career

Mayor of Makati (1988–1998; 2001–2010)

First to third terms (1988–1998) 
On February 27, 1986, Binay became one of President Corazon Aquino’s first appointed local officials after Mayor Nemesio Yabut died while in office during the EDSA Revolution. He was elected in his own right on January 18, 1988, and was reelected on May 11, 1992, and on May 8, 1995. Binay was known as the first city mayor of Makati, as the municipality became a highly-urbanized city on February 4, 1995.

He joined pro-democracy forces in preventing the mutinies against the Aquino administration from being successful. His active role in the defense of the Constitution earned him the nickname "Rambotito" (or little Rambo, after the screen hero), the Outstanding Achievement Medal and a special commendation from Aquino. He became term-limited in 1998 and his position was kept by his wife Elenita.

Fourth to sixth terms (2001–2010) 

On May 14, 2001, Binay reclaimed his post as mayor of Makati, winning over actor, television host, and then-vice mayor Edu Manzano in a landslide victory and became a critic of President Gloria Macapagal Arroyo. He won his fifth term on May 10, 2004, by a large margin against 1st district councilor Oscar Ibay. He ran for his sixth and last term as mayor on May 14, 2007, and won again by a significant margin beating incumbent senator and actor Lito Lapid. His margin over Lapid was then considered as the largest margin in a local election in Makati City.

In October 2006, the Department of the Interior and Local Government (DILG) issued a suspension order against Makati Mayor Jejomar Binay, Vice Mayor Ernesto Mercado, and all members of the city council following an accusation of 'ghost employees' on the city payroll by former vice mayor Roberto Brillante, a political rival. Refusing to cooperate with the suspension order, Binay barricaded himself inside the Makati City Hall. Among those who expressed support were former president Corazon Aquino, actress Susan Roces – the widow of the late movie star and 2004 opposition presidential candidate Fernando Poe Jr. – and several Catholic bishops. After a three-day stand-off, the Court of Appeals issued a temporary restraining order. Before it lapsed, the court issued an injunction order, thereby preventing the Office of the President from enforcing its suspension order until the case was resolved.

Binay – together with his wife, Elenita, and nine others – was vindicated by the courts in a graft case filed by the Office of the Ombudsman over allegations of overpricing in the purchase of office furniture. Allegedly, he had irregular purchases worth ₱232 million from the years 1991–2006. The case was also filed by Brillante, who at that time was leading in Makati a Palace-supported signature campaign to amend the Constitution. The Sandiganbayan Third Division dismissed the graft case filed against him and his six co-accused for lack of factual basis even prior to Binay's arraignment. Critics claimed the suspension order was intended to distract attention from the government's own scandals.

On May 2, 2007, the Bureau of Internal Revenue (BIR) froze all bank accounts of the city government of Makati and the personal accounts of Mayor Binay and Vice Mayor Mercado. The BIR issued the order after it said the city still owed the BIR ₱1.1 billion in withholding taxes of city employees from 1999 to 2002. BIR revenue officer Roberto Baquiran signed and issued the warrant of garnishment against the bank accounts that belonged to Binay, Mercado, the city government and the city's treasurer and accountant.

The city government protested the garnishment order, saying the city had already paid ₱200 million to the BIR as part of a settlement agreement agreed to by Finance Secretary Margarito Teves and former BIR chief Jose Buñag. The city government also said the order was flawed since Baquiran had no authority to issue writs of garnishment and freezing the personal accounts of Binay and Mercado were also unlawful. Ordered by the Court of Tax Appeals (CTA), Binay was made to pay the deficiency in taxes amounting to more than ₱1.1 billion to the BIR, in December 2009.

The garnishment orders were eventually lifted by Malacañang Palace, but not until after Binay slammed the move as politically motivated and patently illegal.

Binay's camp claimed and accused President Arroyo of political harassment. Because of this, as per the DILG, a suspension order was served against Binay over alleged corruption. The latter said that the tax obligations were already settled between the BIR and the Makati city government.

Barely a week before the local elections, the ombudsman suspended Binay based on allegations made by a local candidate allied with Malacañang; it would be revealed that the charges were supported by falsified statements. In a repeat of the October 2006 incident, heavily armed policemen barged into the city hall after office hours, forcibly opening the offices and occupying the building. Binay confronted police officials and representatives of the DILG, while hundreds of supporters once again swarmed the city hall quadrangle to show their support.

The suspension order generated national media attention, and prompted even administration senatorial candidates to protest publicly, saying the action further undermined their chances in the elections. Despite the controversy of this tax liability issue, Binay still won the position of vice president in 2010 by a landslide victory.

A photo of then vice presidential candidate and former Makati City mayor Binay, with his rumored mistress, was leaked online. Though he admitted to having an extramarital affair, Binay said that the leaked photo was part of "black propaganda" against him, because of his high ratings in a vice presidential survey conducted prior to the leaking of the photo. The alleged "black propaganda" device had little to no effect on the campaign of Binay, who closed the gap of votes between him and leading vice presidential candidate Senator Manuel "Mar" Roxas II in a survey. Despite the issue, Binay's landslide victory landed him the position of vice president.

Vice presidency 

Binay initially announced his bid for the presidency for the 2010 elections during his 66th birthday celebration at the Makati City Hall on November 11, 2008, but abandoned his bid to give way to the reelection bid of former president Joseph Ejercito Estrada. He eventually became Estrada's running mate and ran under the banner of PDP–Laban (Partido Demokratiko Pilipino-Lakas ng Bayan).

Binay initially showed a relatively poor performance in public opinion polls, trailing behind senators Loren Legarda and Mar Roxas, the latter of whom was heavily favored to win the race, but Binay's standings improved as the elections approached, overtaking Legarda and tying with Roxas in the final survey conducted. He went on to defeat Roxas in the election.

Binay took his oath as vice president on June 30, 2010, becoming the first local government official to do so. He is also the oldest Filipino to be elected vice president at the age of 67 and the second overall after Teofisto Guingona Jr., who, at age 72, was appointed vice president by Gloria Macapagal Arroyo

Binay was appointed chairman of the Housing Urban Development Coordinating Council (HUDCC) by President Noynoy Aquino, the same position held by his predecessor, Vice President Noli de Castro and Presidential Adviser for Overseas Filipino Workers (Presidential Adviser for OFW Concerns). During this time, Binay was assigned to lead "Task Force OFW", which helped Overseas Filipino Workers who were maltreated by their employers to return to the Philippines with the assistance of the government.
 
Presidential campaign 

Initially, Binay polled highly among expected presidential candidates for the 2016 Philippine general election. However, in a Pulse Asia survey released in September 2015, he placed third after senators Grace Poe and Mar Roxas, the latter of whom was the ruling Liberal Party's presidential candidate. Binay's trust rating had also dropped by 18% due to political harassment and black propaganda by his political enemies.

Speculation as to who Bunay's running mate for 2016 saw fingers pointed in many directions, including the likes of PLDT Chairman Manuel V. Pangilinan, Senator Jinggoy Estrada, Rep. Manny Pacquiao, Nacionalista Party President Manny Villar, and Batangas Governor Vilma Santos. However, his running mate was later revealed to be Senator Gringo Honasan, who was also the vice president of the United Nationalist Alliance.

Platform
Binay disclosed his platform for his 2016 presidential bid during his speech in the Integrated Bar of the Philippines in Cebu City on March 20, 2015.

He aimed to improve the situation in state colleges and universities, public health hospitals and clinics, police stations, and mass housing. He also promised an increase in both salaries and benefits of public school teachers and health workers, members of the police force, and other public servants. As part of his plans, he included a redesigning and re-engineering of the transportation system of the country, as well as prioritizing the building of more infrastructure and the creation of more jobs. He proposed to change the constitution to boost the economy, and speed up the country's development.

In early July of the same year, Binay expressed UNA's (his party list) platform for 2016 in a speech:Ang sigaw ng UNA at ng taumbayan sawa na tayo sa kahirapan, sawa na tayo sa kawalan ng hanapbuhay, sawa na tayo sa kriminalidad at ilegal na droga. Sawa na tayo sa kakulangan ng basic services... hirap na tayo sa manhid at palpak na pamahalaan,What UNA and the citizens are expressing is that we're tired of poverty, we're tired of unemployment, we're tired of criminals and illegal drugs. We're tired of the lack of basic services...we're struggling under a numb and failed government,

Post-vice presidency 

Binay lost the 2016 presidential election to Davao City Mayor Rodrigo Duterte. He called Duterte three days after the election to personally congratulate him. Later, in 2017, Binay became the founding dean of the University of Makati College of Law. In 2019, Binay unsuccessfully ran in the congressional election in Makati's 1st district against former acting mayor Romulo Peña Jr.

Binay had also voiced out in political issues during the Duterte administration. He supported ABS-CBN amidst its franchise renewal controversy. He also stands against the controversial Anti-Terrorism Act of 2020. He has criticized the Duterte administration for failing to manage the COVID-19 pandemic situation in the Philippines. He also said that lawyers are more scared under Duterte than they were under former President Ferdinand Marcos.

On July 24, 2021, Senate President Vicente Sotto III said that Binay will be running for a senatorial seat in 2022. Binay was named to the senatorial slate of Sotto's running mate for president, Senator Panfilo Lacson, as well as to the MP3 Alliance and TRoPa of presidential aspirants Manny Pacquiao and Leni Robredo, respectively, as guest candidate. His Senate bid was also endorsed by vice presidential aspirant Sara Duterte, the Makabayan bloc, Iglesia ni Cristo, and the Council of Bishops of the United Church of Christ in the Philippines. However, he lost in his bid, placing 13th out of the 12 seats up for election with more than 13 million votes.

Personal life
Binay is married to Dr. Elenita Sombilo Binay, who also served as Mayor of Makati from 1998 to 2001. They have five children:
 Maria Lourdes Nancy (Nancy, born May 12, 1973), married to Jose Benjamin Angeles, with four children
 Mar-Len Abigail (Abby, born December 12, 1975), married to Luis Jose Angel Campos Jr., with one child (Martina)
 Jejomar Erwin Jr. (Junjun, born July 12, 1977), a widower of Kennely Ann Lacia, with four children (Jejomarie Alexi, Maria Isabel, Jejomar III, and Maria Kennely)
 Marita Angeline (Anne, born May 12, 1979), married to Don Alcantara
 Joanna Marie Blanca (born November 22, 1988)
In addition to his five children, Binay is also the grandfather to thirteen grandchildren.

Honors and awards

Recognition 
 Outstanding Award, Metro Manila Development Authority (MMDA), 1992
 Award on the Luzon Campaign Medal, 1992
 Special Presidential Award for Service, 2002
 Leadership Award, Presidential Citation, 2002
 Most Outstanding City Mayor of Makati and Consumers Advocate Award, 2003
 University of the Philippines Oblation Run Award Best in Sports Wear, 2004
 Centennial Medal of Honor, 2005
 Outstanding Public Official and Great Achiever, 2005
 World Mayor Award granted by London-based City Mayors, 2006
Bronze Wolf, the only distinction of the World Organization of the Scout Movement, awarded by the World Scout Committee for exceptional services to world Scouting, 2018

Honorary degree 

 Doctor of Public Administration, Polytechnic University of the Philippines, 1992

Notes

References

External links

1942 births
Vice presidents of the Philippines
Advisers to the President of the Philippines
Jejomar
Chairpersons of the Metropolitan Manila Development Authority
Chairpersons of the Housing and Urban Development Coordinating Council of the Philippines
Harvard Kennedy School alumni
Living people
Mayors of Makati
PDP–Laban politicians
People from Makati
Tagalog people
Ilocano people
People from Paco, Manila
Filipino Roman Catholics
20th-century Filipino lawyers
United Nationalist Alliance politicians
Candidates in the 2016 Philippine presidential election
Candidates in the 2010 Philippine vice-presidential election
Recipients of the Outstanding Achievement Medal
Scouting in the Philippines
United Opposition (Philippines) politicians
University of the Philippines Diliman alumni
University of the Philippines Open University alumni
Benigno Aquino III administration cabinet members
Estrada administration personnel
Corazon Aquino administration personnel
Philippine Christian University alumni
Governors of Metro Manila
Recipients of the Bronze Wolf Award